is the former head coach of the Earth Friends Tokyo Z in the Japanese B.League.

Head coaching record

|-
|-
| style="text-align:left;"|Earth Friends Tokyo Z
| style="text-align:left;"|2017-18
| 60||20||40|||| style="text-align:center;"|6th in B2 Central |||-||-||-||
| style="text-align:center;"|-
|-
|-

References

1979 births
Living people
Tokai University alumni
Akita Isuzu/Isuzu Motors Lynx/Giga Cats players
Earth Friends Tokyo Z coaches
Japanese basketball coaches